Geoglomeris subterranea is a species of myriapod belonging to the family Glomeridae.

It is native to Western Europe.

References

Glomerida
Animals described in 1908